Dadao, formerly romanized ta-tao, may refer to:

 dadao (p dàdāo), a machete-like variety of the dao (sword)
 "The Sword March", a Chinese song during the Second Sino-Japanese War (World War II) which begins Dadao!
 Tao, the "Great Way" (p Dàdào) of Eastern philosophy
 The Great Way Government of Shanghai (1937–38) during the early stages of the Second Sino-Japanese War (World War II)

See also
 Twatutia, an area of Taipei on Taiwan known in Chinese as Dadaocheng (p Dàdàochéng, w Ta-tao-ch'eng)